Venusia phasma is a moth in the family Geometridae first described by Arthur Gardiner Butler in 1879. It is found in Japan.

The wingspan is 16–20 mm.

References

Moths described in 1879
Venusia (moth)
Moths of Japan